"Melbourne" is a song by Australian band, The Whitlams. It was released on 27 January 1998. as the third and final single from their third studio album, Eternal Nightcap. The song peaked at number 70 on the ARIA singles chart in June 1998.

Track listing
"Melbourne" – 4:50
"Buy Now Pay Later" (Cottco's Dream remix) – 4:34
"400 Miles from Darwin" (demo) – 3:21
"Your Daddy's Car" – 2:42
"Real Emotional Girl" – 2:45

Charts

References

The Whitlams songs
1998 singles
1997 songs
Songs written by Tim Freedman